Christopher Michael Zithulele Mann(1948 – 10 March 2021) was a South African poet.

Biography 

Chris Mann was born in Port Elizabeth in 1948 and went to Diocesan College (Bishops) in Rondebosch, Cape Town. He studied English and Philosophy at the University of the Witwatersrand, and went to Oxford University as a Rhodes Scholar where he was awarded an MA in English Language and Literature. He also studied African Oral Literature at the School of Oriental and African Studies in London. From 1977 to 1980 he held a lecturer post in the English Department at Rhodes University in Grahamstown, South Africa.  From 1980 to 1995 he worked with an NGO, The Valley Trust at KwaNyuswa outside Durban, after which he returned to Rhodes University where he was a professor of poetry with the Institute for the Study of English in Africa. He was founder and convenor of Wordfest, a national multilingual festival of South African languages and literature with a developmental emphasis. A native English speaker, Mann was also conversant in Afrikaans, isiZulu and isiXhosa. He performed his work at festivals, schools, churches, universities and conferences in South Africa. He was married to artist Julia Skeen.

Works

Books 

 First Poems, 1979. Cape Town: Bateleur Press.
 A New Book of South African Verse, 1979. With Guy Butler. Cape Town: OUP.
 
 
 
 
  with Julia Skeen
 The Roman Centurion’s Good Friday, 1999. Grahamstown: Cathedral of St Michael & St George.
 
 In Praise of the Shades, 2003. Grahamstown: Cathedral of St Michael and St George.
 Walking on Gravity, 2004. Grahamstown: Cathedral of St Michael and St George.
 Thuthula, 2005. Johannesburg: Ravan & PanMacmillan.
 Beautiful Lofty Things, 2005. Grahamstown: Cathedral of St Michael and St George.
 Walking on Gravity, 2005. In: Dante in South Africa. Cullinan, Patrick and Watson, Stephen (Eds.). Cape Town: Centre for Creative Writing, University of Cape Town.
 Lifelines, 2006. With: Skeen, Julia and Craig, Adrian. Pietermaritzburg: UKZN Press.
  with Julia Skeen
 Small Town Big Voice, 2012. Ed. Renard, Andrew. Port Elizabeth: SACEE.
 Rudiments of Grace, 2014. Grahamstown: Cathedral of St Michael and St George.
 Epiphanies, 2017. Grahamstown. Cathedral of St Michael and St George.
 Heraclitus in Africa. forthcoming.

Plays in verse and multimedia poetry productions 

 The Sand Labyrinth. 1980 National Student Drama Festival.
 Mahoon’s Testimony. Broadcast on SAfm in 1998, rebroadcast 2007.
 Frail Care. Broadcast on SAfm in 1997 and re-broadcast in 1999 and 2007.
 The Crux of Being. 1999 National Arts Festival Fringe.
 In Praise of the Shades. 2003 National Arts Festival Fringe.
 Thuthula. 2003 National Arts Festival Main Programme.
 Walking on Gravity. 2004 National Arts Festival Fringe.
 Beautiful Lofty Things. 2005 National Arts Festival Fringe production.
 Lifelines. 2006 National Arts Festival Fringe poetry performance production.
 LifeSongs. 2007 National Arts Festival Fringe installation.
 Epiphanies. 2008. National Arts Festival Fringe installation.
 LifeSongs. 2011. National English Literary Museum installation.
 The Ballad of Dirk de Bruin, 2014. National Arts Festival Fringe.
 Anxiety and Grace. With Julia Skeen. 2016. National Arts Festival Fringe and Spiritfest.
Epiphanies. With Julia Skeen. 2018. National Arts Festival Fringe and Spiritfest.

Articles

 
 
 with Ileana Dimitriu

"Points of Illumination: Wordfest South Africa This Year and Next."

Commentary on Mann's Work 

Mann's work has received critical consideration in journals such as
 The English Academy Review;
 English in Africa;
 Shakespeare in Southern Africa;
 Scrutiny2; and
 Literator.

Awards 

 Newdigate Prize for Poetry while a Rhodes Scholar at Oxford.
 Olive Schreiner Prize for South African Poetry in English. 
 South African Performing Arts Councils’ Playwright Award. 
 Hon.D.Litt. University of Durban-Westville, now University of KwaZulu-Natal.
 Eastern Cape Premier’s Award for Literature. 
 First Professor of Poetry, Rhodes University.
 English Academy of South Africa Thomas Pringle Award for Poetry. 
 Mann's 2014 play The Ballad of Dirk de Bruin which premiered at the National Arts Festival was awarded a Silver Standard Bank Ovation Award for "artistic innovation, excellence and the exploration of new performance styles".
 Honorary Artist in Residence, Grahamstown Cathedral (2017–present)
Guest poet, Incroci di civiltà international poetry festival, Venice 2019
English Academy of South Africa Gold Medal 2019

References

Citations

Sources

External links 

 
 Biography, KZN Literary Tourism
 Biography, Poetry International Rotterdam
 Articles, Mail and Guardian
 Interview, English Experience

20th-century South African poets
English-language poets
1948 births
2021 deaths
Alumni of St Edmund Hall, Oxford
Alumni of the University of London
Academic staff of Rhodes University
People from Port Elizabeth
South African Rhodes Scholars
21st-century South African poets
South African male poets
20th-century South African male writers
21st-century South African male writers
White South African people
South African people of British descent